Deoria is a city in the state of Uttar Pradesh, India. It is one of five tehsils of the Deoria district. Deoria is located 45 km east of Gorakhpur and about 317 km from the state capital Lucknow.  It shares its eastern border with Bihar.

Demographics
As of 2011 Indian Census, Deoria had a total population of 129,479, of which 67,462 were males and 62,017 were females. Population within the age group of 0 to 6 years was 14,779. The total number of literates in Deoria was 99,562, which constituted 76.9% of the population with male literacy of 81.1% and female literacy of 72.3%. The effective literacy rate of 7+ population of Deoria was 86.8%, of which male literacy rate was 91.6% and female literacy rate was 81.6%. The Scheduled Castes and Scheduled Tribes population was 8,177 and 2,228 respectively. Deoria had 20076 households in 2011.

According to the 2001 census Deoria had 104,222 inhabitants (54,737 men, 49,485 women).

Religion
As of 2011, Hinduism is largest religion in Deoria city with 113.640 Hindus (87.77%). Islam is second largest religion in Deoria with 15.098 Muslims (11.66%). Other religions includes 259 Sikhs (0.2%), 177 Christians (0.14%), 110 Buddhists (0.08%), 23 Jains (0.02%), 6 did Others (<0.01%) and 166 did not answer (0.13%).

Notable people
 Shakir Ali, politician and former cabinet minister in the Uttar Pradesh government.
 Virendra K Baranwal, academic, scientist and agricultural researcher
 Surya Pratap Shahi, politician and cabinet minister in the Uttar Pradesh government.

References

External links

 

 
Cities in Uttar Pradesh
Cities and towns in Deoria district